The Investigator is a 1973 British television pilot devised, produced and directed by Gerry Anderson, creator of Thunderbirds and other Supermarionation TV series of the 1960s. It centres on two American youths, John and Julie, who have been recruited by an extragalactic being called "the Investigator" to aid his self-appointed task of ridding Earth of evil and corruption. Miniaturised and given special knowledge and abilities, they take on Stavros Karanti, an unscrupulous businessman plotting to steal a priceless painting from a Maltese cathedral. Shane Rimmer and Sylvia Anderson voice John and Julie, who are represented by  marionette puppets, while Charles Thake and Peter Borg appear as Karanti and his minion Christoph.

The pilot marked Gerry Anderson's first use of puppets since The Secret Service (1969). Written by his wife Sylvia from a story by Rimmer, it was filmed on location in Malta between the production of The Protectors and a planned second series of UFO (which would later be made as Space: 1999). Filming was complicated by numerous technical and logistical difficulties and the crew were unable to finish the shoot. The pilot was assembled from the incomplete footage but Anderson, disappointed with the result, abandoned his idea of pitching it to NBC as the basis for a new Supermarionation series. Unaired to date, the pilot has received a negative response from commentators. It was released on DVD in 2012 and 2015.

Plot
The Investigator (voiced by Peter Dyneley), an omniscient being from another galaxy, has come to Earth to rid it of evil and corruption. To assist him, he has recruited two young Americans, John and Julie (voiced by Shane Rimmer and Sylvia Anderson), whom he has miniaturised and given special powers. In a cave on Malta, the Investigator (represented by a flashing green light) gives John and Julie their first assignment: they are to foil crooked entrepreneur Stavros Karanti's (Charles Thake) plan to steal a priceless Raphael painting from St John's Cathedral in Mdina. To aid their mission, he provides them with an eight-wheel miniature car equipped with powerful surveillance devices. Thanks to his new abilities, John instantly knows how to drive the car.

John and Julie go to Angel's Leap and spy on Karanti as he boards his yacht, the Borgia, and meets his associate Christoph (Peter Borg). When the men come ashore and drive to Mdina, John and Julie follow. While touring St John's, to which he has donated a fake painting, Karanti learns of the cathedral's security arrangements. Karanti and Christoph return to the Borgia pursued by John and Julie, who board the yacht via a miniature speedboat provided by the Investigator. The youths accidentally knock over an object, alerting the criminals to their presence, but avoid being discovered thanks to their small size.

Returning to St John's at night with John and Julie again on their tail, Karanti and Christoph knock out the cathedral's security guard and seize the Raphael painting. John tries to stop the criminals by mounting a chandelier and swinging it at them. Karanti fires a gun at John, missing him but causing him to fall to the floor, injured. Karanti and Christoph get away. Leaving Christoph at the harbour, Karanti drives to a nearby airfield, planning to leave Malta in his Cessna 150 plane. John and Julie beat him to the airfield and stow away aboard the Cessna before Karanti takes off. Speaking through a miniature megaphone, John pretends to be Karanti's conscience urging him to surrender. At the same time, Julie uses a remote control to make the plane repeatedly roll and dive, terrifying Karanti. On John's instructions, Karanti radios air traffic control to confess his crimes and lands at the airfield, where he is arrested by police.

With the painting safely returned to the cathedral, John and Julie report back to the Investigator, who congratulates them on a job well done.

Production
The Investigator was Gerry Anderson's first puppet production since The Secret Service (1969), the last Supermarionation series to be made by his former company Century 21 Productions. Having gone on to make the live-action series UFO and The Protectors, neither of which were made specifically for children, Anderson wanted to create something new for the younger audience and devised The Investigator as the template for a new Supermarionation programme, intending to pitch it to American network NBC in the hope that it would commission a series. The pilot was planned by Anderson, his wife Sylvia and their long-time business partner Reg Hill. Written by Sylvia from a story by Shane Rimmer, it was funded by private venture capital and produced by off-the-shelf company Starkits between The Protectors and a planned second series of UFO (which was later made as Space: 1999).

The project saw the return of several crew members from the Supermarionation years, such as co-editor David Lane, as well as the reunion of voice actors Sylvia, Rimmer and Peter Dyneley, all of whom had voiced characters in Thunderbirds. Charles Thake had previously appeared in an episode of The Protectors. Unlike the puppets of 1960s Supermarionation, which had been controlled from overhead bridges, they were operated from the ground with the puppeteers standing on boxes. Julie was modelled on Raquel Welch. Modified versions of the puppets later appeared in Alien Attack, a 1977 TV advertisement produced by Gerry Anderson. The model car and speedboat were designed by Hill and operated by radio control.

The Investigator was shot entirely on location in Malta, which had served as a location for The Protectors and was chosen for its architecture and scenery. Specific locations included the Main Gate and St Paul's Cathedral in Mdina as well as Malta International Airport. Filming was beset by technical and logistical problems. Low light meant that the crew often had to shoot in close-up, which made it hard to capture the scale and detail of the locations. The model car was affected by radio signals from RAF Nimrods, causing it to crash into objects or speed off in the wrong direction. Poor weather also disrupted the proceedings. At one point, heavy rain forced the crew to film outdoor scenes under a plastic cover that started to leak, soaking the set. On another occasion, a storm hit while Gerry Anderson was on Malta and the rest of the unit were on Gozo, leaving the director and his crew cut off from each other and causing the production to lose a day. Another day was lost when the sailing yacht doubling as the Borgia fouled its anchor.

Anderson did not have facilities in Malta to view rushes from the production. Footage was instead flown back to the UK, where it was processed by Hill. Eventually the production's schedule ran out and the crew were forced to return to the UK before they had finished filming. This meant that the aerial footage for the scenes aboard Karanti's plane had to be shot over the English countryside. The pilot was then put together using the material available.

The theme music was composed by Vic Elmes, Sylvia Anderson's then son-in-law. Elmes was originally to have scored the entire pilot, but Gerry Anderson was unimpressed with his efforts and replaced him with John Cameron, the composer for The Protectors. The incidental music was recycled from Cameron's work on that series.

Reception

The Andersons and Hill were disappointed with the finished pilot and abandoned the idea of pitching it, feeling that its quality was too low to satisfy NBC or any other broadcaster. Gerry Anderson's opinions on The Investigator ranged from a "pretty dull, uninspired piece of filmmaking" to a "disaster". He regretted serving as both director and producer as he felt that his need to limit costs as producer compromised his vision as director. In his 1996 biography, he called the project an "absolute non-starter" and reflected that "everything, but everything went wrong on The Investigator."

Simon Archer and Marcus Hearn compare The Investigator to The Secret Service, which combined puppets and live actors in a similar way. They describe it as an "extrapolation" of the earlier series. Ian Fryer suggests that The Investigator "pushed the notion further" by being filmed entirely on location. He argues that the pilot displays "decent professional standards" and that the "sketchiness" of the premise can be justified by the fact that unlike the first episodes of the Supermarionation productions, where all story elements had been approved prior to filming, The Investigator was made as a "true pilot" whose elements were still subject to approval. He praises the model work, believing the car and speedboat to be well designed despite the low budget, but regards John and Julie as poorly-developed characters, pointing out that they receive a shorter introduction than the car. Suggesting that an Investigator series could have been a "junior version" of Mission: Impossible, noting that 1973 was the "tail end of the post-Bond craze", Fryer acknowledges the pilot's failure, concluding that "the return of Supermarionation died, unheralded, on the rain-swept streets of Malta."

TV Zone magazine comments that the lack of puppet movement "does little to enliven the characters" and calls The Investigator a "poor attempt to recreate the heyday of Century 21". SFX describes it as a "weirdly forlorn thing" and "existentially peculiar even by Anderson's standards." According to Anderson's son Jamie, The Investigator "lacked the science fiction context that made [his] previous shows so successful."

Other media
Toy versions of the car and speedboat were produced by Dinky. However, the toys' launch was cancelled when it became clear that no series would be made. After being redesigned and repackaged to omit all references to The Investigator, the car and speedboat eventually went on sale in 1975 and 1977 respectively.

For many years The Investigator was unavailable on any home video format, although fan-made copies existed and it was screened at Anderson conventions. In 2012, Fanderson released a DVD of The Investigator exclusively for its members. The print used to make the DVD had been restored by BBC Resources, which also recreated its missing closing titles. The Investigator was later included in 2015's "The Lost Worlds of Gerry Anderson" DVD by Network.

References

Works cited

External links

1973 in British television
British science fiction television films
British television shows featuring puppetry
Cathedrals in fiction
English-language television shows
Fiction about size change
Marionette films
Television episodes about alien visitations
Television episodes about theft
Television episodes set in Malta
Unaired television pilots